Robert Franks may refer to:

Bobby Franks (1909–1924), American murder victim of Leopold and Loeb
Bob Franks (1951–2010), U.S. Representative from New Jersey
Robert Franks (basketball) (born 1996), American basketball player

See also
Robert Frank (disambiguation)
Robert Franco (disambiguation)